Behar Shtylla (11 March 1918 – 8 December 1994) was an Albanian diplomat, member of the Central Committee of the Party of Labour of Albania and Minister of Foreign Affairs from 1953 to 1966.

Shtylla was one of the most experienced and versatile Albanian diplomats, starting as the preferred person of Enver Hoxha to work in Albania's foreign affairs. His first nomination was as a plenipotentiary ambassador in Paris. In 1953 he replaced Enver Hoxha as Foreign Minister, remaining in the post for 13 years until 1966.

References

1918 births
1994 deaths
Albanian communists
Government ministers of Albania
Foreign ministers of Albania
People from Korçë
Ambassadors of Albania to France
Speakers of the Parliament of Albania
Members of the Parliament of Albania
Ambassadors of Albania to Italy
Ambassadors of Albania to China